The Hospital das Clínicas da Faculdade de Medicina da Universidade de São Paulo (University of São Paulo Faculty of Medicine Clinics Hospital) is a complex of health institutions, located in various regions of the city of São Paulo, Brazil. Founded on April 19, 1944, it occupies a total area of 600,000 square meters and offers 2,400 beds, distributed among its eight specialized institutes and two assisting hospitals. The main complex of the institution is also connected to a metro station.

Buildings, Institutes and assisting hospitals
The largest part of the complex, located in the central region of São Paulo in the Consolação district, consists of:
Administration Building
Central Institute (ICHC)
Heart Institute (Instituto do Coração - INCOR)
Orthopedics and Traumatology Institute (IOT)
Psychiatry Institute (IPq)
Radiology Institute (INRAD)
Children's Institute (Instituto da Criança) (ICr)
Instituto Dr Arnaldo de Vieira
Medical Investigation Laboratories (LIM) (building under project, the governor have decided to give the State Secretary of Health building to create this research institute).
Clinics Journal

On other locations, the complex is divided into:
Suzano Assisting Hospital, located in the town of Suzano;
Institute of Physical Medicine and Rehabilitation - IMREA (former Division of Rehabilitation Medicine)
Vila Mariana Unit, located on the southern part of the city of São Paulo;
Umarizal Unit, located nearby the base;
Cotoxó Assisting Hospital, located in Vila Pompéia, in the city of São Paulo;
Medical Investigation Laboratories, administrative unit located in the Cerqueira César district;
Rebouças convention center, located across the street from the base hospital.
AIDS House (providing care to HIV/AIDS patients)
S.A.M.S.S. (Employees' Medical and Social Assistance Service)

Clinics journal

The hospital publishes Clinics an open access journal. It is edited by Luiz Felipe Pinho Moreira.

Abstracting and indexing
The journal is indexed and abstracted in the following bibliographic databases:

Index Medicus/MEDLINE/PubMed
Scopus
Science Citation Index
 LILACS
PubMed Central

Chronology
The base complex and satellite buildings have been built gradually since 1944. The chronology for each institute's starting year follows.

Units
Central Institute - 1944
Psychiatry Institute - 1952
Orthopedics and Traumatology Institute - 1953
Administration Building - 1972
Medical Investigation Laboratories - 1975
Institute of Physical Medicine and Rehabilitation (former Division of Rehabilitation Medicine)
Vila Mariana Unit - 1975
Umarizal Unit - 2001
Child Institute - 1976
Heart Institute - 1977
Ambulatory Building - 1981
Rebouças Convention Center - 1982
AIDS House - 1994
Radiology Institute - 1994
Cancer Institute - 2008

Assisting hospitals
Suzano Assisting Hospital - 1960
Cotoxó Assisting Hospital - 1971

References

External links
Official Website (in Portuguese)
Rebouças Convention Center Website (in English)
Medical Investigation Laboratories Website (in Portuguese)
Map Hospital das Clinicas Location 

Hospital buildings completed in 1944
Teaching hospitals in Brazil
University of São Paulo
clinicas
Hospitals established in 1944
1944 establishments in Brazil